Notre Dame Fighting Irish fencing represents the University of Notre Dame in collegiate fencing. The Irish compete in the Atlantic Coast Conference of NCAA Division I.

National championships
Men: 1977, 1978, 1986
Women: 1987
Co-ed: 1994, 2003, 2005, 2011, 2017, 2018, 2021, 2022

Individual championships
Women's Foil
Molly Sullivan (1986), Molly Sullivan (1988), Heidi Piper (1991), Alicja Kryczalo (2002), Alicja Kryczalo (2003), Alicja Kryczalo (2004), Lee Kiefer (2013), Lee Kiefer (2014), Lee Kiefer (2015), Lee Kiefer (2017), Stefani Deschner (2021) 
Women's Épée
Magda Krol (1997), Kerry Walton (2002), Kelly Hurley (2008), Courtney Hurley (2011), Courtney Hurley (2013), 
Women's Sabre
Valerie Providenza (2004), Mariel Zagunis (2006), Sarah Borrmann (2008), Francesca Russo (2015), Francesca Russo (2017), Kara Linder (2021)
Men's Foil
Pat Gerard (1977), Andrew Bonk (1979), Charles Higgs-Coulthard (1984), Gerek Meinhardt (2010),  Ariel DeSmet (2011), Gerek Meinhardt (2014), Nick Itkin (2018), Nick Itkin (2019), Marcello Olivares (2021)
Men's Épée
 Björne Väggö (1978), Ola Harstrom (1983), Jubba Beshin (1990), Michal Sobieraj (2005), 
Men's Sabre
Mike Sullivan (1977), Mike Sullivan (1978), Luke LaValle (1998), Gabor Szelle (2000), Luke Linder (2021)

Year-by-year results

Coaches
Gia Kvaratskhelia (2014-present)

Janusz Bednarski (2003-2014)

Yves Auriol (1996-2002, Men's; 1986-2002, Women's)

Michael De Cicco (1962-1995)

Walter Langford (1940-1943, 1951-1961)

The Winning Streak

From 1975 to 1980, the Irish won 122 straight regular season matches, surpassing John Wooden's 88 consecutive basketball wins to set the NCAA varsity sports winning streak record, a record not broken for over a decade. (Interestingly, UCLA lost to Austin Carr's Notre Dame team in 1971, then went undefeated until Adrian Dantley's Notre Dame team in 1974). The Irish won their first national championship in 1977 and again in 1978; Mike DeCicco led them to NCAA championships again in 1986, 1987, and 1994; they now hold 12 national championships (2022).'''

Castellan Family Fencing Center
The Irish practice at the Castellan Family Fencing Center, which opened in 2012 as part of the Joyce Center. It features locker rooms for men and women, coaches' offices, a lounge area, a repair room, and a conference room.

References 

 

http://www.und.com/sports/c-fenc/archive/nd-c-fenc-archive.html

https://www.ncaa.com/history/fencing/nc

https://und.com/news/2018/3/25/Notre_Dame_Clinches_Tenth_National_Fencing_Title.aspx

https://und.com/fencing-wins-11th-national-championship-in-program-history/